|}

The Prix du Calvados is a Group 2 flat horse race in France open to two-year-old thoroughbred fillies. It is run at Deauville over a distance of 1,400 metres (about 7 furlongs), and it is scheduled to take place each year in August.

History
The event is named after Calvados, the department in which Deauville is located. It was established in 1970, and it was initially contested over 1,300 metres. It was extended to 1,400 metres and given Group 3 status in 1977.

The Prix du Calvados is currently the first Group race of the year in France exclusively for two-year-old fillies. It was sponsored by PMU since 2013 and by Longines from 2014 to 2016. The race was upgraded from Group 3 to Group 2 in 2018.

Records
<div style="font-size:90%">
Leading jockey (3 wins):
 Yves Saint-Martin – Theia (1975), Lady Jane Grey (1977), Rayonnante (1985)
 Freddy Head – Maximova (1982), Savannah's Honor (1987), Fairy Path (1994)
 Christophe Soumillon - Cours de la Reine (2004), Great Page (2015), Fev Rover (2020)

Leading trainer (4 wins):
 François Boutin – Joberane (1973), Bernica (1980), Whakilyric (1986), Savannah's Honor (1987)Leading owner (3 wins):
 Sir Michael Sobell – Waterway (1978), Helen Street (1984), Arousal (1989)</div>

Winners since 1975

Earlier winners

 1972: Fiery Diplomat
 1973: Joberane
 1974: Margravine

See also
 List of French flat horse races

References
 France Galop / Racing Post:

 france-galop.com – A Brief History: Prix du Calvados. galop.courses-france.com – Prix du Calvados – Palmarès depuis 1983. galopp-sieger.de – Prix du Calvados. horseracingintfed.com – International Federation of Horseracing Authorities – Prix du Calvados (2017). pedigreequery.com – Prix du Calvados – Deauville.''

Specific

Flat horse races for two-year-old fillies
Deauville-La Touques Racecourse
Horse races in France
Recurring sporting events established in 1970